Table tennis is competed in the East Asian Games since the 2009 East Asian Games in Hong Kong.

Medalists

Men's singles

Women's singles

Men's doubles

Women's doubles

Mixed doubles

Men's team

Women's team

See also
 East Asian Games
 Table tennis at the Asian Games

References

http://sports.sohu.com/s2013/2786/s386034638/

East Asian Games
Sports at the East Asian Games
East Asian Games